Athyrmina is a genus of moths of the family Noctuidae.

Species
Athyrmina albigutta (Swinhoe, 1895)
Athyrmina birthana (Swinhoe, 1905)
Athyrmina melanosticta (Hampson, 1895)

References
Natural History Museum Lepidoptera genus database

Catocalinae